The Colegio Humboldt Puebla ("Humboldt School Puebla,"  "Puebla German School") is a German international school in Cuautlancingo, Puebla State, in Greater Puebla. It serves levels maternal through high school (preparatoria).

The school was first established with 10 primary students and a German teacher in 1911.

See also
 German Mexicans

References

External links
 Colegio Humboldt Puebla 
 Colegio Humboldt Puebla 

Education in Puebla
High schools in Mexico
German international schools in Mexico
1911 establishments in Mexico
Educational institutions established in 1911